The Volga Shipping Company is a Russian ship-owning company within UCL Holding and is ultimately controlled by Vladimir Lisin's Fletcher Group Holdings Ltd.

Operations 

The company now owns a fleet of 300 vessels, which carried 6.7 million tonnes of freight and 368,000 passengers in 2011. 
 The company operates over 236 cargo ships and tankers.

History 
The company was founded in 1843 as On the Volga steamship company, went through a number of structural and ownership changes over the years, emerging under its current name and structure in 1994.

See also
Vodohod

References

External links

Shipping companies of Russia
Russian brands
Companies based in Nizhny Novgorod
Companies formerly listed on the Moscow Exchange
Companies established in 1843
1843 establishments in the Russian Empire
Shipping companies of the Soviet Union